Erik Hjalmar Lundqvist (29 June 1908 – 7 January 1963) was a Swedish athlete who won a gold medal in the javelin throw at the 1928 Summer Olympics. Two weeks later he became the first man to break the 70 m barrier, setting a new world record at 71.01 m.

References

Swedish male javelin throwers
Olympic gold medalists for Sweden
Athletes (track and field) at the 1928 Summer Olympics
Olympic athletes of Sweden
1908 births
1963 deaths
Medalists at the 1928 Summer Olympics
Olympic gold medalists in athletics (track and field)